The 1968–69 VCU Rams men's basketball team represented the newly created Virginia Commonwealth University during the 1968–69 NCAA men's basketball season. Led by Benny Dees, the Rams played their inaugural season as an independent team, playing a mix of Division I, II and III schools across the Mid-Atlantic, Ohio River Valley and Southeast regions. After an 0–4 start, the Rams finished the season with a winning record of 12–11.  During the season, they played in two winter tournaments; the Fort Eustis and Quantico tournaments held at Virginia military bases, Joint Base Langley–Eustis and Marine Corps Base Quantico. The team did not earn a berth into either the NCAA or NIT tournaments.

During the team's inaugural season, the Rams played in the Franklin Street Gymnasium, which was their home arena until the opening of the Siegel Center in the late 1990s.

Schedule 

|-
!colspan=12 style="background:#000000; color:#FFFFFF; border:2px solid #FFBA00;"| Non-conference regular season

References 

Vcu
VCU Rams men's basketball seasons
VCU Rams men's basketball
VCU Rams men's basketball